A guild is an association of craftspeople in a particular trade.

Guild may also refer to:

Arts, entertainment, and media
 Guild (computer gaming), an organized group of players who regularly play video games together
 Guild (video game series), game compilations Guild01 and Guild02 from Level-5
 Europa 1400: The Guild, a video game
 The Guild 2,  sequel to Europa 1400: The Guild
 The Guild (web series), a comedy series created by Felicia Day
 In fantasy, an organization that aims to give aid to adventurers, for example a Thieves' guild

Brands and enterprises
 Guild Guitar Company, a guitar manufacturer
 Guild Inn, a park and hotel in Toronto

Places
 Guild, Missouri, United States
 Guild, New Hampshire, United States

Science
 Guild (ecology), a group of species that exploit the same resources, or different resources in related ways
 Guild (permaculture), a group of species within which each provides a unique set of diverse functions that work in conjunction or harmony

Other uses
 Guild (surname)
Guild Home Video, a UK home distribution company.
 The Guild, Preston, a grade II listed public house in Preston, England
The Guild of European Research-Intensive Universities, a network of European research universities

See also
 Gild (disambiguation)
 Guild Theatre (disambiguation)